The Curtesy Act (11 Hen. 3) was an act passed by the Parliament of England in 1226 and extended to the Lordship of Ireland by Poynings' Law. It governed courtesy tenure, i.e. the life interest which a widower may claim in the lands of his deceased wife. The short title was assigned in the Republic of Ireland in 1962, shortly before the act was repealed by the Succession Act, 1965.

References

1220s in law
Acts of the Parliament of England
1226 in England